Kochino is a rural locality (a village) in Nifantovskoye Rural Settlement, Sheksninsky District, Vologda Oblast, Russia. The population was 6 as of 2002.

Geography 
Kochino is located 9 km southwest of Sheksna (the district's administrative centre) by road. Tarkanovo is the nearest rural locality.

References 

Rural localities in Sheksninsky District